John Schmitt may refer to:

 John Schmitt (economist) (born 1962), American economist
 John Schmitt (American football) (born 1942), American football player 
 John Schmitt (rower) (1901–1991), American rower

See also 
 John Schmidt, U.S. Associate Attorney General
 Jon Schmidt (born 1966), American pianist from Utah